Jason Wilson (born 2 July 1987) is an Australian field hockey striker from Kingscliff, New South Wales.  He made his top-level club hockey debut in 2003.  While living in New South Wales, he represented Queensland in national competitions on the junior and senior level. He is a member of the Australia men's national field hockey team, and earned a pair of gold medals at the 2010 Men's Hockey Champions Trophy and 2010 Commonwealth Games.

Personal
Wilson is from Kingscliff, New South Wales.

Field hockey
Wilson is a striker. By the time he was seventeen years old, he had played in hockey matches in many of Australia's major cities. He first competed in top grade club hockey in 2003. In 2005, he played for the Eastern Suburbs. In 2008, he played for the Brisbane Hockey League side, Easts Tigers. He currently plays for the Delhi Waveriders in the Hockey India League

State team
Wilson represented Queensland as a U18, U21 and senior state representative while he was living in Tweed Heads, New South Wales. He was a member of all three teams in 2005. As a seventeen-year-old, six days a week, his mother would drive him 2 hours each way to Brisbane in order for him to practice with the state team. In 2008, he was a member of the Queensland state team, the Queensland Blades. He was with the team in 2010.  In a June game against the Northern Territory, he scored two goals. In 2010, he played in the final game of the season for his state team in the Australian Hockey League.

National team
Wilson has played for Australia's senior national team. In 2009, he was a member of the national team during a five-game test series in Kuala Lumpur, Malaysia against Malaysia. In 2009, he represented the country on a tour of Europe. He competed in the third match of the tour against England where Australia won 5–4. He was a member of the national team in 2010. That year, he was a member of the team that finished first at the Hockey Champions Trophy. In 2010, he also represented Australia at the Commonwealth Games, and played in the game against Pakistan during the group stage. In the gold medal match against India that Australia won 8–0, he scored two goals. In May 2011, he played in the Azlan Shah Cup for Australia.  The Cup featured teams from Pakistan, Malaysia, India, South Korea, Britain and New Zealand. He won gold at the 2011 Champion Trophy, playing in the finals game and having at least one shot on goal in the game. In December 2011, he was named as one of twenty-eight players to be on the 2012 Summer Olympics Australian men's national training squad. This squad will be narrowed in June 2012.  He trained with the team from 18 January to mid-March in Perth, Western Australia. In February during the training camp, he played in a four nations test series with the teams being the Kookaburras, Australia A Squad, the Netherlands and Argentina. He is one of several Queensland based players likely to play in a three-game test series to be played in Cairns, Queensland from 22 to 25 June against the New Zealand's Black Stickss. Final Olympic section will occur several days before this test and his inclusion in the series will be contingent upon being selected.

References

External links
 
 
 

1987 births
Living people
Australian male field hockey players
Commonwealth Games gold medallists for Australia
Commonwealth Games medallists in field hockey
Field hockey players at the 2010 Commonwealth Games
Delhi Waveriders players
Hockey India League players
Sportsmen from New South Wales
Field hockey people from New South Wales
Medallists at the 2010 Commonwealth Games